State Road 126 (SR 126) is a  state highway in southern Jacksonville, in the U.S. state of Florida, traveling along Emerson Street. It travels from SR 13 (Hendricks Avenue) east across U.S. Route 1 (US 1; SR 5; Philips Highway) and Interstate 95 (I-95; SR 9). East of I-95, SR 126 splits from Emerson Street, turning northeast on the beginning of the Emerson Expressway (originally the Emerson Leg of the Hart Bridge Expressway). SR 126 ends where the Emerson Expressway becomes a divided freeway. (Emerson Street continues east as a city street to Spring Glen Road just south of US 90 (Beach Boulevard; SR 212).

State Road 228A

The rest of the Emerson Expressway is the unsigned  State Road 228A (SR 228A), traveling roughly north from the end of SR 126 to a merge with SR 228 (Hart Bridge Expressway). Other than at SR 228, it has one interchange – a full six-ramp partial cloverleaf at U.S. Route 90 (US 90; SR 212; Beach Boulevard).

The part of SR 126 east of US 1, and the whole of SR 228A, is signed (concurrently in the case of SR 126) as part of US 1 Alternate (US 1 Alt.). SR 126/Emerson Street is the only non-freeway section of US 1 Alt., which bypasses Downtown Jacksonville to the east via the Hart Bridge.

Major intersections

See also

References

126
126
126